The following is a list of United States senators and representatives who died of natural or accidental causes, or who killed themselves, while serving their terms between 1950 and 1999. For a list of members of Congress who were killed while in office, see List of United States Congress members killed or wounded in office.

Party colors:

1950s

1960s

1970s

1980s

1990s

See also 
 List of United States Congress members who died in office (1790–1899)
 List of United States Congress members who died in office (1900–1949)
 List of United States Congress members who died in office (2000–)

References

External links 
 Memorial Services for members of the U.S. Congress who died in the 1950s
 Memorial Services for members of the U.S. Congress who died in the 1960s
 Memorial Services for members of the U.S. Congress who died in the 1970s
 Memorial Services for members of the U.S. Congress who died in the 1980s
 Memorial Services for members of the U.S. Congress who died in the 1990s

1950